Woodburn is a surname. Notable people with the surname include:

Arthur Woodburn (1890–1978), Scottish politician; MP, government minister, and Secretary of State for Scotland
Ben Woodburn (born 1999), Welsh football player
Charles Woodburn (born 1971), British businessman
Danny Woodburn (born 1964), American actor
Jimmy Woodburn (1917–1978), Scottish football player
Kim Woodburn (born 1942), British television personality
William Woodburn (1838–1915), American politician from Nevada; U.S. representative 1875–89
Willie Woodburn (1919–2001), Scottish football player

English toponymic surnames